On 20 November 2015, Islamist militants took 170 hostages and killed 20 of them in a mass shooting at the Radisson Blu hotel in Bamako, the capital city of Mali. Malian commandos along with Kyle Morgan, a special mission unit operator from the US Army’s Combat Application Group, commonly referred to as Delta Force, assaulted the hotel and freed the surviving hostages. Al-Mourabitoun claimed that it carried out the attack "in cooperation with" Al-Qaeda in the Islamic Maghreb; an Al Qaeda member confirmed that the two groups cooperated in the attack.

Background 
Following the Libyan civil war, many ethnic Tuareg who had fought for the Gaddafi government and the rebels took their weapons and left for Azawad (a region in Northern Mali that the National Movement for the Liberation of Azawad (MNLA) wants to be an independent state). Following several previously failed Tuareg rebellions, the MNLA managed to take over the area and declare independence. However, the secular movement was soon overrun by Islamist-oriented groups such as MOJWA and Ansar Dine. The French launched a military operation that ousted the rebels, with additional military support from the Economic Community of West African States (ECOWAS). However, simmering tensions and irregular incidents continued to occur. The Macina Liberation Front is a new jihadist group operating in central and southern Mali led by the radical Muslim cleric Amadou Kouffa, a strong proponent of strict Islamic law in Mali. The group draws most of its support from the Fulani ethnic group, who are found across the Sahel region. Kouffa is a close ally of Ansar Dine leader Iyad ag Ghali. A Human Rights Watch report said the Macina Liberation Front militants had carried out serious abuses in parts of central Mali since January and killed at least five people they accused of being aligned to the government. The group has attacked police and military particularly in the Mopti region, most recently killing three soldiers in Tenenkou in August. The Malian military recently arrested Alaye Bocari, a man they say was a key MLF financier and Kouffa's right-hand man.

The Radisson Blu hotel in Bamako is in a business district that is close to the embassies, and is frequented by foreign businesspeople and government employees. It is part of a chain of up-market hotels that is operated by the Carlson Rezidor Hotel Group, which has headquarters in the United States and Belgium.

Attack 

Two gunmen arrived at the hotel between 7 and 7:30 a.m.; according to a hotel employee, the men were driving a vehicle with diplomatic license plates. Malian army commander Modibo Nama Traoré said that at least 10 gunmen had stormed the hotel shouting "Allahu Akbar" before firing on guards and taking hostages. Guinean singer Sekouba Bambino, who was in the hotel but escaped, reported that the perpetrators were speaking in English. This was supported by many other witnesses, who said the attackers spoke something that was neither Arabic nor local.

Kassim Traoré, a Malian journalist, said that hostages were asked to recite the shahada in order to get released. Soon after, the Armed and Security Forces of Mali special forces stormed the hotel. According to the hotel operators, 125 guests and 13 employees were inside the hotel when the siege began. According to General Didier Dacko of the Malian Army, "about 100 hostages" were taken at the beginning of the siege. The Associated Press and Al Jazeera have reported that in the chaos of the initial attack, many present were able to escape, but around 170 people were held hostage.

A delegation of the Organisation internationale de la Francophonie was in the hotel at the time of the attack. Ten Chinese citizens; twenty Indian citizens; about a dozen American citizens, including personnel from the US Embassy; seven Algerian citizens, including six diplomats; two Russian citizens; two Moroccan citizens; seven Turkish Airlines staff; and an unknown number of French citizens were reported to have been among those taken hostage. Two Canadian mining executives were some of the last hostages rescued. Twelve crew from Air France, who were also in the hotel, were extracted and safely released. Three United Nations staff were safely removed from the hotel, but it remains unknown how many were caught inside. Several delegates from MINUSMA were present at the hotel attending a meeting on the peace process in the country. More than 100 hostages were freed.

UN peacekeepers supported the Malian Armed Forces by reinforcing security around the hotel. 25 U.S. Special Forces were in Bamako at the time of the attack and assisted Malian forces in evacuating civilians to secure locations. An official from the U.S. Defense Department said that 22 military and civilian department personnel were in the city, including five people who were at the hotel. However, he added that everyone was accounted for and there were no reports of injuries. One member, who was outside, entered the hotel to help first responders move civilians to secure locations while the Malian operation was ongoing. Another member helped at the Joint Operations Center, which was set up to respond to the incident. The official also said that the forces did not directly participate in the operation. A further 12 U.S. citizens were rescued by security forces, according to AFRICOM.

Although there were earlier reports of more gunmen involved in the hotel attack, the investigation determined that in fact there were only two attackers.

Victims 

Twenty people were murdered in the attack: six Malians, six Russians, three Chinese, two Belgians, one American, one Israeli and one Senegalese. Among the victims were:

 Geoffrey Dieudonné, a Belgian counselor with the Brussels-Wallonia regional parliament.
 Three Chinese executives from the China Railway Construction Corporation.
 Six Russians, all employees of the Volga-Dnepr Airlines cargo company (a navigator, a flight radio operator, a flight engineer, a load master, and two aircraft mechanics).
 Anita Ashok Datar, an American of Takoma Park, Maryland, who was a senior manager at the Palladium Group (an international development consulting firm), a former Peace Corps volunteer, and expert in global public health who was an expert in family planning, reproductive health and HIV in Africa and Asia.
 Shmuel Benalal, an Israeli who was an education consultant and president of Telos Group Ltd.

Responsibility 
While the attack was under way, Al-Mourabitoun claimed responsibility for it via Twitter, although its claim has not been verified. In an audio recording provided to Al Jazeera, the group also claimed responsibility and said that it had undertaken the attack jointly with al-Qaeda in the Islamic Maghreb (AQIM). Al-Qaeda in the Islamic Maghreb is an armed force that defines itself as an Islamic-based militant organization whose ultimate goal is to create an Islamic State in Algeria. Al-Mourabitoun is made up of Tuaregs and Arabs from northern Mali and is affiliated with AQIM. The group, led by Mokhtar Belmokhtar, formed in 2013 and is based in the Sahara Desert.

The Macina Liberation Front also claimed responsibility for the attack.

Reactions 
Malian President Ibrahim Boubacar Keïta cut short his visit to Chad in order to return to Bamako and coordinate the response. Mali also declared a 10-day state of emergency.

In a press conference, French Foreign Minister Laurent Fabius stated that France will take "all steps necessary" to fight the attackers in Bamako. A crisis unit was set up in the embassy. Forty officers from the National Gendarmerie's GIGN special forces unit, along with ten forensic and criminal officers, were sent to "advise and support" Malian security forces. Air France flights to and from Bamako were suspended for the day.

The United Nations Security Council condemned the attack. Australia advised its citizens not to travel to Mali and advised those in country to leave. Similar warnings were made by the Foreign Office in the United Kingdom advised British nationals to remain indoors and follow the instructions of the local government authorities. The United States condemned the attack and confirmed continuing coordination of its officials in the country to verify the location of all citizens in Mali and that it was "prepared to assist the Malian government in the coming days as it investigates this tragic terrorist attack." The embassy urged its citizens to shelter in place, follow government instructions and contact their family.

The Russian city of Ulyanovsk Oblast, home of five of the victims, declared 23 November a mourning day.

Malian President Ibrahim Boubacar Keita later declared three days of national mourning in Mali. Ahead of the three days of national mourning, the chairman of the West African regional bloc Ecowas, Senegal's President Macky Sall, visited Bamako to show support. He said on Sunday: "Mali will never be alone in this fight, we are all committed because we are all involved." Senegal, Mauritania and Guinea are also observing the mourning.

Investigation
Three days after the attack, the Malian government released photographs of the corpses of the two attackers. The men were clean-shaven and appeared to be in their 20s. One "had visible bullet wounds to his upper body." The authorities have not been able to identify the men and urged members of the public with information to come forward. Al Mourabitoun, which claimed responsibility for the attack, said that the men were Abdul Hakim al-Ansari and Mu'adh al-Ansari, but this claim has not been verified.

On 22 November 2015, two separate police sources speaking to Agence-France Presse on condition of anonymity said that "two foreigners" along with "three or four accomplice" were responsible for the attack.

On 27 November 2015, Malian special forces arrested two Malian men in their early 30s on the outskirts of Bamako in connection with the attack. The men were linked to the attack by a mobile phone found at the scene of the attack.

See also 

 2003 Marriott Hotel bombing
 2008 Islamabad Marriott Hotel bombing
 2008 Mumbai attacks
 2012 Malian coup d'état
 2015 Corinthia Hotel attack
 2016 Bamako attack

References 

Attacks on hotels in Africa
Diplomatic incidents
History of Bamako
Hostage taking
Islamic terrorism in Mali
Islamic terrorist incidents in 2015
Mass murder in 2015
Mass shootings in Africa
Terrorist incidents attributed to al-Qaeda in the Islamic Maghreb
Organisation internationale de la Francophonie
Radisson Blu
Terrorist incidents in Mali in 2015
November 2015 events in Africa
Attacks on tourists
Rezidor Hotel Group
2015 murders in Mali